Struan John Stirton Stevenson (born 4 April 1948) is a Scottish politician. He was the Conservative Member of the European Parliament (MEP) for Scotland from 1999 to 2014 and chair and Vice Chair of the Committee on Fisheries, in addition to which he was a member of the Executive of the Scottish Conservative party. He was President of the European Parliament's Delegation for Relations with Iraq and President of the Friends of Free Iran Intergroup (FoFI).

Stevenson is President of the European Iraqi Freedom Association (EIFA) and Coordinator of the Campaign for Iran Change. He is a columnist with The Herald and an international lecturer on human rights. He is CEO of Scottish Business UK (SBUK), a pro-Union business group. He was educated at the independent Strathallan School and the West of Scotland Agricultural College.

Political career
Stevenson served his early political career as a local councillor for 22 years, sitting on South Ayrshire Council and its predecessor body the Kyle and Carrick District Council. He stood for election to Parliament at the 1987 election, the 1992 election and 1997 election. He was then elected to the European Parliament in 1999, and retained his seat in 2004 and 2009. He retired from the European Parliament at the elections in 2014.

Semipalatinsk radiation victims

As an MEP, Stevenson led an international campaign to raise awareness and secure aid for the victims of radiation in the Semipalatinsk region of Kazakhstan, where the Soviet Union government tested 607 nuclear devices from 1949 to 1990, leaving an appalling legacy of pollution, deprivation, illness and death. He was awarded with an honorary doctorate in Science from the Semey State Medical Academy, State Medical Academy in Semipalatinsk in recognition of his efforts and on his third visit to Kazakhstan in 2003, he was made an honorary citizen of Semipalatinsk.

In September 2004 Stevenson won a $50,000 prize in an international essay competition sponsored by the US-based John Templeton Foundation for an essay entitled "Crying Forever" describing the suffering of the people of Semipalatinsk. Stevenson donated the entire $50,000 to Mercy Corps Scotland to assist with their work in Semipalatinsk.

In 2006 he published a book, also entitled Crying Forever, detailing his experiences in Kazakhstan. The book was launched at the UN Headquarters in New York and all proceeds from its sale were presented by Stevenson to the Children's Hospital in Semipalatinsk, totalling over $20,000. In January 2007 Stevenson was decorated by the President of Kazakhstan with the "Shapagat" ("Mercy") award for his humanitarian work in Semipalatinsk.

Ban of cat and dog fur

Stevenson also led a successful campaign for eight years in the European Parliament to impose an EU-wide ban on the import, export and trade in cat and dog fur. It was estimated that up to two million cats and dogs were being slaughtered each year in China alone, simply to meet demand for fur products in Europe. Working with Humane Society International, Stevenson's campaign generated more than a million emails and signatures on petitions, finally culminating in a draft regulation being prepared by the European Commission and voted through the European Parliament. The regulation was enacted into European Union law across all 27 Member States in 2008.

Climate change

Stevenson was president of the European Parliament's Climate Change, Biodiversity & Sustainable Development Intergroup. He has been an outspoken critic of off-shore wind farms. Stevenson has recently cited the loss of ocean carbon sinks due to offshore wind turbines as a possible reason not to build them, and outlined the pros and cons of wind turbines in his book, So Much Wind: The Myth of Green Energy.

Iraq

Stevenson was chairman of European Parliament's Delegation for Relations with Iraq (2009-2014). Since the foundation of the European Iraqi Freedom Association (EIFA), a non-governmental and non-profit organisation based in Brussels 4 April 2014, he has acted as its president.

Personal life
His wife, Pat Stevenson is a former editor of BBC Radio Scotland. They have two sons and three grandsons.

Bibliography
 The Course of History: Ten Meals That Changed the World (2017)
 
 
 Stalin's Legacy: The Soviet War on Nature (2012)
 Crying Forever: A Nuclear Diary (2006)
 Crying Forever (Russian version) (2006)

References

External links
Profile at European Parliament website
Personal website
Official biography

1948 births
Living people
People educated at Strathallan School
People from South Ayrshire
Scottish Conservative Party councillors
Scottish Conservative Party MEPs
MEPs for Scotland 1999–2004
MEPs for Scotland 2004–2009
MEPs for Scotland 2009–2014
Alumni of Scotland's Rural College
Scottish Conservative Party parliamentary candidates